Let the Peoples Sing (known until 1964 as Let the People Sing) is an international choral competition currently organised by the European Broadcasting Union (EBU). The final, encompassing three categories and around ten choirs, is offered as a live broadcast to all EBU members. The Silver Rose Bowl is awarded to the best choir in the competition.

History
The competition was first organised by BBC Radio in 1957, originally as a national contest for amateur British choirs under the title Let the People Sing, and ran until 1982 as a weekly series each year. The final round of the first competition was broadcast in the Light Programme on 23 April 1957 and was followed four days later by a special concert relayed from the Royal Albert Hall. In the two subsequent years (1958–59) the final concert was held at the Royal Festival Hall. The contest also led to new choral works being commissioned.

In 1965 the annual competition became an international one, with participation extended to include choirs from Denmark, Finland, Norway, and Sweden. It was further extended in the 1970s with entrants also coming from other countries with radio networks belonging to the EBU, each of the networks organising the national qualifying rounds leading to the international finals. Broadcasters submitted tapes of the choirs which they entered, and these were then listened to and evaluated by the professional jury who decided the winners in each category. There was no broadcast of the entire competition at this time. In 1993, the Euroradio-networked choral competition moved to a biennial schedule, held in the autumn of odd-numbered years. In 1995, at the initiative of Danish Radio, it was decided that while recordings would continue to be used for the preliminary rounds, however the finals should be hosted as a live radio event. These were broadcast via the Union's Euroradio satellite network, with the choirs performing in their home cities to listeners across Europe and to the jury. Since 2001, the finalists have been invited to perform at a concert by the host broadcaster. The competition has become more or less a festival with many more concerts and a supporting workshop program.

After the 1982 competition, the BBC ceased broadcasting the national selection and international heats, and for a number of years aired only the final round. The BBC had hosted the international finals since its inception. In 1983, Germany's national public radio broadcaster Deutschlandradio hosted the final round, they were later joined as host by Finnish broadcaster Yle from 1987; both took over the organisation of the competition held on an alternating basis in Cologne and Helsinki respectively. The 1991 competition finals was the last to be held in Finland until 2017.

In 1984, BBC Two broadcast a new national competition in association with Sainsbury's supermarket; Choir of the Year ran every two years until 2002, however after Sainsbury's sponsorship ended that year, it was taken over by BBC Radio 3 (supported by Arts Council England and Sing Up) in 2005 where it continued until 2016. BBC Four aired highlights of the final. The winning choir often proceeded to represent the UK at the international Let the Peoples Sing competition.

Since the late 1990s, Radio 3's broadcast of Let the Peoples Sing has moved away from the main evening concert (except when hosting in 2011), towards coverage in specific choral programmes such as Performance on 3 (1999, 2003), Choirworks (2001–2003), Choir and Organ (2007–2011), The Choir (2009, 2013–2015) and since 2017, Through the Night. BBC Radio 3 hosted the 2001 and 2003 competitions live from the Queen Elizabeth Hall, in London and the 2011 edition was staged at the new MediaCityUK studios in Salford, Greater Manchester.

In 2019, the competition took place in Spain for the first time and was hosted by Catalunya Ràdio, at the 2,049-seat Palau de la Música Catalana in Barcelona on 13 October. The previous competition, hosted by Finnish broadcaster Yle, took place at the Helsinki Music Centre on 15 October 2017. German radio station BR-Klassik hosted the 2015 edition in Munich at the Funkhaus studios. Luxembourg’s Philharmonic Hall was the host venue in 2013.

In November 2021, the 60th anniversary was celebrated with the BBC Singers performing a dedicated concert at St Peter's Church, Eaton Square, in London that was later broadcast by BBC Radio 3 and many other EBU radio stations.

Categories 
The competition has three categories, with a winner selected in each category in addition to the overall winner of the Silver Rose Bowl.
 Children and Youth (no members over age 25)
 Adult (any age)
 Open, for choruses who perform music of particular cultural traditions or styles (e.g. folksong, gospel, barbershop, jazz, traditional music, etc.)

List of winners

By competition 

In 1973, 1979, 1980, 1987, and 1990 the Silver Rose Bowl was awarded ex aequo.

In 2015 the Young People's Chorus of New York City (YPC) became the first American choir to place first in the competition's history of 54 years. After Sunday's competition performances among YPC, the Aarhus Girls' Choir from Denmark and the Romanian Radio Children's Choir, the judges named the Danish choir the winner. However, on Monday morning, the judges rethought their initial decision and determined that the American chorus should tie with the Danish choir for first place in the Children's and Youth category. However, the Aarhus Girls' Choir ultimately prevailed in the finals of the competition.

By country
The table below shows the years that a country won the Silver Rose Bowl.

Years in italics indicate joint wins (ex aequo)

See also 

 ABU Song Festivals
 Bala Turkvision Song Contest
 Bundesvision Song Contest
 Cân i Gymru
 Caribbean Song Festival
 Eurovision Choir of the Year
 Eurovision Dance Contest
 Eurovision Magic Circus Show
 Eurovision Song Contest
 Eurovision Young Dancers
 Eurovision Young Musicians
 Intervision Song Contest
 Junior Eurovision Song Contest
 OGAE
 OGAE Second Chance Contest
 OGAE Video Contest
 Sopot International Song Festival
 Turkvision Song Contest

References

External links 

Choral festivals
Singing competitions
Eurovision events
Recurring events established in 1961
Biennial events
Youth music competitions
Awards established in 1961
Early career awards
BBC Radio 3 programmes
Music radio programs